Lode may refer to:

 Lode Aerts (born 1959), bishop of Bruges, Belgium
 Lode Anthonis (1922–1992), Belgian racing cyclist
 Lode Campo (1926–2009), Flemish Belgian business executive
  (born 1972), Flemish politician
 Lode Claes (born 1997), Belgian journalist, lawyer and politician
 Lode Craeybeckx (1897–1976), mayor of Antwerp, Belgium
  (born 1953), Belgian politician
  (born 1965), Flemish politician
  (born 1929), Belgian university professor and historian
 Lode Wouters (1929–2014), Belgian cyclist
 Lode Wyns (athlete) (born 1946), Belgian athlete
 Lode Wyns, Belgian molecular biologist and professor
 Lode Zielens (1901–1944), Belgian novelist and journalist
 Christoph Lode (born 1977), German novelist
 Holger Lode (born 1967), German specialist for pediatrics
 Marius Lode (born 1993), Norwegian footballer
  (born 1852)
 Trond Lode (born 1974), Norwegian politician
 William de Lode (died 1403), prior of Spinney Abbey in Cambridgeshire